Dan Earl Callahan (born July 11, 1938) is a former American football player who played with the New York Titans. He played college football at Wooster College and the University of Akron.

References

1938 births
Living people
American football guards
Akron Zips football players
Wooster Fighting Scots football players
New York Titans (AFL) players
Players of American football from Akron, Ohio